Chaleh (also Romanized as Chāleh; also known as Chāleh Kūkherd) is a village in Kukherd Rural District, Kukherd District, Bastak County, Hormozgan Province, Iran. At the 2006 census, its population was 278, in 52 families.

References 

3.	الكوخردى، محمد بن يوسف، (كُوخِرد حَاضِرَة اِسلامِيةَ عَلي ضِفافِ نَهر مِهران) الطبعة الثالث، دبي: سنة 1997 للميلاد Mohammed Kookherdi (1997) Kookherd, an Islamic civil at Mehran river,  third edition: Dubai
4.	محمدیان، کوخری، محمد، “ (به یاد کوخرد) “، ج۱، ج۲. چاپ اول، دبی: ۲۰۰۳ میلادی Mohammed Kookherdi Mohammadyan (2003), Beyade Kookherd, third edition : Dubai.
5.محمدیان، کوخردی، محمد،  «شهرستان بستک و بخش کوخرد»  ، ج۱. چاپ اول، دبی: ۲۰۰۵ میلادی Mohammed Kookherdi Mohammadyan (2005), Shahrestan  Bastak & Bakhshe Kookherd, First edition : Dubai.
6.عباسی، قلی، مصطفی،  «بستک و جهانگیریه»، چاپ اول، تهران : ناشر: شرکت انتشارات جهان
7.   سلامى، بستكى، احمد.  (بستک در گذرگاه تاریخ)  ج۲، چاپ اول، ۱۳۷۲ خورشيدى
8. اطلس گیتاشناسی استان‌های ایران [Atlas Gitashenasi Ostanhai Iran] (Gitashenasi Province Atlas of Iran)

External links 

  Kookherd Website.

Populated places in Bastak County
Kukherd District